Andheri (Officially, LIC Andheri), is a metro station on Line 1 of the Mumbai Metro serving the Andheri suburb of Mumbai, India. It was opened to the public on 8 June 2014. After Ghatkopar, Andheri is the busiest station on Line 1, with a daily passenger traffic of 72,125 in February 2017.

The Andheri station is connected with the Andheri railway station's foot-over bridge through a skywalk. MMOPL later built a shorter connector that reduced the time taken by commuters to switch systems.

Like other Line 1 stations, the interior walls of Andheri station are embellished with murals. The designs at Andheri were styled by three third-year architecture students: Shamika Desai, Misri Patel, and  Shriya Sanil.

History
In February 2017, MMOPL announced that Andheri station would be rebranded as Bank of Baroda Andheri Metro station, as part of a sponsorship deal.

Station layout

Connections

Exits

See also
Public transport in Mumbai
List of Mumbai Metro stations
List of rapid transit systems in India
List of Metro Systems

References

External links

The official site of Mumbai Metro
 UrbanRail.Net – descriptions of all metro systems in the world, each with a schematic map showing all stations.

Mumbai Metro stations
Railway stations in India opened in 2014
2014 establishments in Maharashtra
Andheri